This is a list of approximately 167 species in the legume tree genus Albizia, the silk trees, sirises or albizias.

Numerous species placed in Albizia by early authors were eventually moved to other genera, particularly Archidendron and many other Ingeae, as well as certain Acacieae, Mimoseae, and even Caesalpinioideae and Faboideae.

The delimitation of Falcataria and Pithecellobium - close relatives of Albizia - is notoriously complex, with species having been moved between the genera time and again, and probably will continue to do so. Other closely related genera like Chloroleucon and Samanea are often merged with Albizia entirely.

A
 Albizia acle (syn. Mimosa acle) - acle, akle
 Albizia acrodena
 Albizia adianthifolia (Schumach.) W.Wight (syn. Albizia fastigiata  (E.Mey.) Oliv.)
 Albizia adinocephala (syn. Pithecellobium adinocephalum)
 Albizia altissima
 Albizia amaniensis 
 Albizia amara
 Albizia amoenissima
 Albizia androyensis
 Albizia angolensis
 Albizia angulata
 Albizia anthelmintica
 Albizia antunesiana
 Albizia arenicola
 Albizia arunachalensis
 Albizia atakataka
 Albizia attopeuensis (Pierre) I.C.Nielsen
 Albizia aurisparsa
 Albizia austrobrasilica
 Albizia aylmeri

B
 Albizia balabaka
 Albizia barinensis
 Albizia bequaerti
 Albizia bernieri Villiers
 Albizia berteriana – Bertero albizia
 Albizia boinensis
 Albizia boivinii – endemic to Madagascar
 Albizia bracteata
 Albizia brevifolia
 Albizia buntingii
 Albizia burkartiana
 Albizia burmanica

C
 Albizia calcarea
 Albizia canescens – Belmont siris
 Albizia carbonaria – naked albizia, cotton varay
 Albizia carrii
 Albizia charpentieri
 Albizia chevalieri Harms
 Albizia chinensis – Chinese albizia
 Albizia commiphoroides
 Albizia comorensis
 Albizia comptonii
 Albizia conjugato-pinnata
 Albizia corbisieri
 Albizia coriaria
 Albizia coripatensis
 Albizia corniculata
 Albizia crassiramea

D
 Albizia deplanchei
 Albizia distachya
 Albizia divaricata
 Albizia dolichadena
 Albizia dubia
 Albizia duclouxii

E
 Albizia edwallii
 Albizia elegans
 Albizia eriorhachis 
 Albizia euryphylla

F
 Albizia fastigiata
 Albizia ferruginea – musase
 Albizia flamignii
 Albizia forbesii
 Albizia fournieri

G
 Albizia garrettii
 Albizia gigantea
 Albizia gillardinii
 Albizia glaberrima (Schum. & Thonn.) Benth.
 Albizia glabrior
 Albizia glabripetala
 Albizia grandibracteata
 Albizia granulosa
 Albizia greveana - endemic to Madagascar
 Albizia guachapele
 Albizia guillainii
 Albizia gummifera - native to Ethiopia and Kenya

H
 Albizia harveyi
 Albizia hasslerii
 Albizia heblirghd

I

 Albizia inundata – maloxo, muqum, paloflojo, timbo blanco, timbo-ata, "canafistula"
 Albizia isenbergiana

J
 Albizia jaubertiana
 Albizia julibrissin – Persian silk tree, pink siris, nemu tree, bastard tamarind, Lenkoran acacia; shabkhosb (Persian); nemunoki, nemurinoki, nenenoki (Japanese)

K
 Albizia kalkora (Roxb.) Prain – Kalkora mimosa
 Albizia katangensis
 Albizia kostermansii

L

 Albizia lancangensis
 Albizia lankaensis
 Albizia lathamii
 Albizia laurentii
 Albizia lebbeck – Lebbeck, lebbek tree, frywood, koko, woman's-tongue tree
 Albizia lebbekoides – Indian albizia
 Albizia leonardii
 Albizia letestui
 Albizia littoralis
 Albizia lucidior
 Albizia lugardi

M
 Albizia macrophylla
 Albizia mahalao
 Albizia mainaea - endemic to Madagascar
 Albizia malacophylla
 Albizia masikororum
 Albizia minyi
 Albizia morombensis
 Albizia mossambicensis
 Albizia mossamedensis
 Albizia multiflora – monkey's earring, "guanacaste"
 Albizia myriophylla

N
 Albizia nayaritensis
 Albizia niopoides – Tantakayo albizia
 Albizia numidarum

O
 Albizia obbiadensis
 Albizia obliquifoliolata
 Albizia odorata
 Albizia odoratissima
 Albizia oliveri
 Albizia orissensis
 Albizia ortegae

P

 Albizia papuensis
 Albizia pedicellaris
 Albizia pedicellata
 Albizia pentzkeana
 Albizia perrieri
 Albizia petersiana
 Albizia philippinensis
 Albizia pistaciifolia – guayacán cenega, guayacán chaparro, guayacán hobo (Colombia); nance, tinto de bajos (Ecuador); carabali, quiebrahacho, vera macho (Venezuela)
 Albizia poilanei
 Albizia poissoni
 Albizia polycephala
 Albizia polyphylla - endemic to Madagascar
 Albizia pospischilii
 Albizia procera – tall albizia

R
 Albizia retusa
 Albizia rhombifolia
 Albizia richardiana
 Albizia rosea
 Albizia rosulata
 Albizia rufa

S

 Albizia sahafariensis
 Albizia salomonensis
 Albizia saman – rain tree, saman, monkey pod; cenízaro (Spanish); campano (Colombia, Venezuela)
 Albizia saponaria – white-flowered albizia
 Albizia schimperiana
 Albizia sherriffii
 Albizia simeonis
 Albizia sinaloensis – Sinaloan albizia
 Albizia splendens
 Albizia subdimidiata
 Albizia suluensis – Zulu albizia

T
 Albizia tanganyicensis
 Albizia tanganyicensis ssp. adamsoniorum
 Albizia thompsonii
 Albizia tomentella
 Albizia tomentella var. rotundata
 Albizia tomentella var. sumbawaensis
 Albizia tomentosa – Tomentose Albizia
 Albizia tulearensis

U
 Albizia umbalusiana

V
 Albizia vaughanii
 Albizia verrucosa
 Albizia versicolor
 Albizia vialeana
 Albizia viridis

W
 Albizia welwitschii
 Albizia welwitschioides
 Albizia westerhuisii

Z
 Albizia zimmermannii
 Albizia zygia

Formerly placed here

 Acacia caesia var. caesia (as Albizia sikharamensis)
 Acacia mearnsii (as Albizia mearnsii)
 Acacia neumanniana (as Albizia neumanniana)
 Archidendron bubalinum (as Albizia bubalina)
 Archidendron clypearia (as Albizia clypearia)
 Archidendron clypearia ssp. clypearia (as Albizia angulata)
 Archidendron glomeriflorum (as Albizia glomeriflora)
 Archidendron jiringa (as Albizia jiringa)
 Archidendron lucyi (as Albizia lucyi)
 Archidendron oppositum (as Albizia macrothyrsa)
 Archidendron palauense (as Albizia papuana (Scheff.) F. Muell.)
 Archidendron turgidum (as Albizia croizatiana, A. lucida auct. non Benth., A. turgida)
 Archidendron yunnanense (as Albizia yunnanensis (Kosterm.) Y.H. Huang)
 Archidendropsis basaltica (as Albizia basaltica)
 Archidendropsis thozetiana (as Albizia thozetiana)
 Calliandra houstoniana  var. anomala (as Albizia callistemon)
 Cathormion umbellatum ssp. moniliforme (as Albizia amoenissima)
 Chloroleucon mangense var. mangense (as Albizia marthae)
 Enterolobium cyclocarpum (Guanacaste; as Albizia longipes)
 Erythrophleum teysmannii (as Albizia cambodiana)
 Falcataria moluccana (Moluccan Albizia; as Albizia eymae, A. fulva, A. moluccana)
 Havardia albicans (Chucum, Cuisache; as Albizia lundellii, A. rubiginosa)
 Hesperalbizia occidentalis (Palo Esopeta; as Albizia obliqua, A. occidentalis, A. plurijuga)
 Pararchidendron pruinosum var. junghuhnianum (as Albizia tengerensis)
 Paraserianthes lophantha (as Albizia lophantha)
 Paraserianthes lophantha ssp. montana (as Albizia montana)
 Pithecellobium decandrum (as Albizia decandra)
 Pithecellobium dulce (Madras Thorn; as Albizia dulcis)
 Pithecellobium flavovirens (as Albizia flavovirens)
 Pithecellobium nicoyanum (as Albizia nicoyana)
 Pseudosamanea cubana (as Albizia cubana)
 Schleinitzia megaladenia (as Albizia megaladenia)
 Serianthes minahassae ssp. fosbergii (as Albizia melanesica)
 Serianthes minahassae ssp. minahassae (as Albizia minahassae)
and others

Footnotes

References
  (2005): Genus Albizia. Version 10.01, November 2005. Retrieved 2008-MAR-30.

Albizia
Albizia